The Immediate Geographic Region of São João del-Rei is one of the 10 immediate geographic regions in the Intermediate Geographic Region of Barbacena, one of the 70 immediate geographic regions in the Brazilian state of Minas Gerais and one of the 509 of Brazil, created by the National Institute of Geography and Statistics (IBGE) in 2017.

Municipalities 
It comprises 14 municipalities:

 Conceição da Barra de Minas
 Coronel Xavier Chaves
 Lagoa Dourada
 Madre de Deus de Minas
 Nazareno
 Piedade do Rio Grande
 Prados
 Resende Costa
 Ritápolis
 Santa Cruz de Minas
 São João del-Rei
 São Tiago
 São Vicente de Minas 
 Tiradentes

Statistics 
Population: 188 356 (July 1, 2017 estimation).

Area: 5 838,734 km2.

Population density: 32,3/km2.

Trivia 
The region was a major gold producing zone in the 1700s.

Ecclesiastical circunscription 
Of the 14 municipalities, 13 municipalities are part of the Roman Catholic Diocese of São João del-Rei, in the ecclesiastical province of Juiz de Fora.

Only São Tiago is part of a different diocese: the Roman Catholic Diocese of Oliveira, in the ecclesiastical province of Belo Horizonte.

References 

Geography of Minas Gerais